Video door-phone  (also known as video door entry or video intercom) is a stand-alone intercom system used to manage calls made at the entrance to a building (residential complex, detached family home, workplace, etc.) with access controlled by audiovisual communication between the inside and outside. The main feature of video door entry is that it enables the person indoors to identify the visitor and, if (and only if) they wish, engage in conversation and/or open the door to allow access to the person calling.

Equipment 
Video door entry consists of both outside and indoor elements: an outdoor panel on the outside, an electronic lock release, and an indoor monitor. The outdoor panel or street panel is installed beside the entrance door or gateway and incorporates different elements ready for use in any climate conditions: one or several pushbuttons to make the call (usually one per home or apartment), a micro camera adapted for night vision to capture the image of the caller, a microphone to pick up their voice and a speaker to reproduce the voice of the occupant indoors.

A video door entry panel may include push buttons to call the homes or offices and a camera to capture the street scene.
The video entry monitor allows the occupant to see who has called, talk to the visitor and open the door.
Installed indoors, the monitor consists of a screen showing the image of the person calling, a microphone and earpiece for conversation and a pushbutton to trigger the door lock release. The communication setup is a full duplex. The electric door release is a device installed in the door lock and operated from inside the building to lift the latch and clear the way for the visitor.

Common equipment types 

There are several variations on this basic format. In addition to outdoor panels with one pushbutton per apartment, it is possible to find others with a numeric keypad: in this case, designed for large residential installations, the homes are identified by codes. Others have built-in cardholder panels or even small screens to guide the user or facilitate entry for people with disabilities. Some video entry monitors have an earpiece similar to a telephone handset, while others are "hands-free". Other examples are monitors with memories that store an image every time someone calls at the door or touchscreen video entry systems.

Adaptive equipment 
Different equipment sets are currently found on the market which make use more accessible for people with different disabilities. So, thinking of the visually impaired, the outdoor panel may include information in Braille alongside the pushbuttons, or a voice synthesiser can also be added which indicates when the door is opened. For people with hearing impairment, the outdoor panel may include a screen with icons signalling the communication status: if the user is calling, if someone is speaking from indoors or opening the door. Also with this type of user in mind, the monitor may be fitted with an inductive loop, an element that interacts with conventional hearing aids to facilitate the conversation with the outside without their presence being noticed by other users. The kit also includes visual or audio call alerts.

See also
Door phone
Courtesy phone
Speaking tube
Fermax
Intercom
ButterflyMX

References

Access control